Nicholas Richard Cowdery  (born 19 March 1946), is a barrister who served as the Director of Public Prosecutions for the Australian state of New South Wales from 1994 to 2011. Cowdery also served as president of the International Association of Prosecutors from 1999 to 2005.

Early life and education
Cowdery attended Wollongong High School and completed his secondary schooling at the Sydney Grammar School. He graduated in Arts and Law at the University of Sydney where he was a resident of St. Paul's College, where he is now an Honorary Fellow.

Cowdery was awarded with an Honorary Doctor of Laws from the University of Wollongong in 2011.

Career
In 1971, he commenced practising as a public defender in Papua New Guinea after admission as a barrister in the same year. Cowdery entered private practice in 1975, where he stayed until 1994, concentrating on criminal law, common law, administrative law and some commercial law. He was appointed Queen's Counsel in 1987, served as an Associate Judge of the District Court between 1988 and 1990.

Cowdery was appointed the director of public prosecutions for New South Wales in 1994, and ended his sixteen-year tenure in 2011. During his term as NSW Director of Public Prosecutions he was, according to Phillip Adams "... an outspoken critic of the pace and style of drug reform, .... and of the mandatory sentencing regimes in the Northern Territory and Western Australia. With his office independent of government, Cowdery would often speak out publicly against politicians - especially if he disagreed with them. Cowdery's notable successful prosecutions include Ivan Milat, Gordon Wood, and Keli Lane.

Cowdery was elected president of the International Association of Prosecutors in 1999 and re-elected to a second three-year term in September 2002. Since his retirement as public prosecutor, he holds a number of honorary academic positions including as an adjunct professor of law at the University of Sydney's Institute of Criminology; a visiting professorial fellow at the University of New South Wales and the University of Wollongong's law faculties; and as an adjunct professor at Charles Sturt University. Cowdery is also a Fellow of the Australian Academy of Law.

He is a member of the board of the Rule of Law Institute of Australia and is the chairman of the Magna Carta Committee of the Rule of Law Institute, a body that celebrated the 800th anniversary of Magna Carta.

Cowdery was chairman of White Ribbon Australia before standing down after it was revealed in the media that Cowdery had earlier made comments about the sex life of Keli Lane, a convicted murderer.

Honours
Cowdery was appointed a Member of the Order of Australia in June 2003; and an Officer of the Order in June 2019 in recognition of his distinguished service to the law, to the protection of human rights, to professional legal bodies, and to the community.

Selected published works

References

External links
 Rule of Law Institute of Australia website
 Magna Carta Committee website

1946 births
Australian barristers
Australian prosecutors
Living people
People educated at Sydney Grammar School
Sydney Law School alumni
Judges of the District Court of NSW
20th-century Australian judges
Australian King's Counsel